The 21st  cycle of America's Next Top Model (subtitled as America's Next Top Model: Guys & Girls) premiered on August 18, 2014 and it is the 15th season to air on The CW. It was the second season to feature male and female contestants. Tyra Banks and Kelly Cutrone retained their positions on the judging panel. Runway coach J. Alexander returned to the judging panel, replacing former judge Rob Evans while Johnny Wujek, creative director since Cycle 19, was succeeded by photographer Yu Tsai. In keeping with the last two cycles, social media was a factor in eliminations, with public voting taking place on the show's official page. The fourteen finalists were revealed when voting began.

The international destination for this cycle was Seoul, South Korea. This also marks the final ever international destination for the show.  Five of the episodes were filmed in Seoul, one of which featured James of Royal Pirates, and the finale had guest appearances from K-pop girl group 2NE1, boy band BTOB, actor and model Lee Soo-hyuk and fashion designer Lie Sang Bong.

The winner of the competition was 26-year-old Keith Carlos from Bridgeport, Connecticut. He was the show's first male winner. Will Jardell placed as the runner up, and later appeared with his boyfriend, James Wallington, in The Amazing Race 32, where they go on to win.

Eighth-placing finalist Mirjana Puhar was shot and killed on February 24, 2015, in her boyfriend's home in Charlotte, North Carolina.

Prizes
Returning prizes include: a modeling contract with NEXT Model Management, a spread in Nylon magazine, and a US$100,000 campaign with Guess

Contestants
(Ages stated are at start of contest)

Episodes

Summaries

Call-out order

 The contestant returned to the competition
 The contestant was eliminated
 The contestant was disqualified from the competition
 The contestant was originally eliminated but was saved 
 The contestant won the competition

Bottom two

 The contestant was eliminated after their first time in the bottom two
 The contestant was eliminated after their second time in the bottom two
 The contestant was eliminated after their third time in the bottom two
 The contestant was eliminated after her fourth time in the bottom two
 The contestant was disqualified from the competition
 The contestant was originally eliminated but was saved.
 The contestant was eliminated in the final judging and placed third
 The contestant was eliminated in the final judging and placed as the runner-up

Average call-out order
Casting call-out order, comeback first call-out and final three are not included.

Scoring chart

 Indicates the contestant won the competition.
 Indicates the contestant had the highest score that week.
 Indicates the contestant was eliminated that week.
 Indicates the contestant was in the bottom two that week.
 Indicates the contestant was disqualified that week.
 Indicates the contestant was originally eliminated that week, but was saved.

Photo shoot guide
Episode 1 photo shoot: Runway selfies (casting)
Episode 2 photo shoots: Four seasons wardrobe in the subway; leather swimwear on the beach (casting)
Episode 3 video & photo shoot: Opening titles; wet and wild in black and white
Episode 4 photo shoot: Twofold illusion atmosphere
Episode 5 commercial: Black widow fragrance in pairs
Episode 6 motion shoot: Hair whipping & flipping
Episode 7 photo shoot: Frostbitten at an ice rink
Episode 8 photo shoot: Futuristic heritage with Corybot
Episode 9 photo shoot: Mitch Stone essentials ad campaign
Episode 10 photo shoot: Composite couples for HIV awareness
Episode 12 photo shoot: MCM Bags at Seoul City Hall
Episode 13 photo shoot: Jinny Kim shoes at Gyeongbokgung Palace
Episode 14 photo shoot: Portraying Elvis Presley and Marilyn Monroe
Episode 15 photo shoots: Tyra Beauty campaign; Guess campaign
Episode 16 photo shoot: Nylon magazine spreads

Makeovers
Romeo – Dyed ice blonde with grey contacts 
Ben – Buzz cut 
Kari – Long ice blonde weave with bleached eyebrows; later, bangs added 
Matthew – Shaved sides 
Denzel – Lace front beard weave 
Mirjana – Karlie Kloss inspired blunt bob cut 
Raelia – Voluminous curly weave like afro 
Chantelle – Ombre style long weave 
Shei – Hair and eyebrows half platinum blonde, half jet black 
Lenox – Dyed dark brown, tips trimmed
Adam – Buzz cut 
Will – Pompadour style 
Keith – No makeover

Notes

References

America's Next Top Model
2014 American television seasons
Television shows filmed in California
Television shows filmed in South Korea